Prokopia (Greek: Προκοπία; c. 770 – after 813) was the empress consort of Michael I Rhangabe of the Eastern Roman Empire. She was a daughter of Nikephoros I. The name of her mother is not known. Her only known sibling is Staurakios.

Marriage
Prokopia married Michael Rhangabe during the late 8th century. He was a son of Theophylaktos Rhangabe, admiral of the Aegean fleet.

In 802, reigning Empress Irene was deposed by an alliance of patricians and eunuchs. Their leader was Nikephoros, father of Prokopia, who at the time held the position of finance minister (logothetēs tou genikou). On 31 October 802, Nikephoros was declared to be the next Emperor, making Prokopia a member of the imperial family. Her husband received the high court dignity of kouropalatēs.

On 26 July 811, Nikephoros was killed while fighting against Krum of Bulgaria at the Battle of Pliska. Much of the Eastern Roman army was annihilated with him in what is considered one of the worst defeats in Roman history. Among the few survivors was Staurakios, who succeeded as emperor.

Staurakios had not escaped the battlefield unharmed. A sword wound near his neck had left him paralyzed. Members of the imperial guard had managed to transfer him to Adrianople but he never fully recovered from his wounds. The matter of Staurakios' succession was deemed urgent and two factions emerged at court. One centered on Theophano, wife of the Emperor, who reportedly sought to succeed her husband. The other centered on Prokopia, who intended to place her husband on the throne.

Prokopia failed to persuade her brother to go along with her wishes at first. He apparently favored Theophano. However Michael and Prokopia had gathered enough support at court to threaten Staurakios himself. Unable to face opposition at his condition, Staurakios declared his brother-in-law as his designated heir and abdicated at the same time. He then retired to a monastery. Prokopia had become the new Empress consort.

Empress
On 2 October 811, Michael I Rhangabe succeeded to the throne and Prokopia became the Empress consort. She is said to have effectively dominated the court for his brief reign. She insisted on following her husband in campaigns but her presence reportedly was not welcomed by the troops.

Michael generously distributed money to the army, the bureaucracy, and the Church in an effort to establish himself. He also reopened negotiations with Charlemagne and recognized the rival emperor as basileus (emperor) (but not as Emperor of the Romans). However the war with Krum continued and would bring the downfall of the imperial couple.

On 22 June 813, Michael lost the Battle of Versinikia. The imperial army was significantly larger than the Bulgarian but failed to use its advantage. Michael was among the first to retreat from the battlefield and other units followed his lead. Krum advanced to East Thrace and Constantinople itself had become a viable target. Whatever support Michael and Prokopia had managed to gain did not long survive the military defeat.

On 11 July 813, Michael abdicated the throne in favor of Leo V the Armenian. Theophanes Continuatus, the continuation to the chronicle of Theophanes the Confessor, records that Prokopia opposed the abdication to no avail. She had to retire to a monastery soon after the abdication. Her year of death is not known.

Children

Prokopia and Michael I had at least five children:
 Theophylaktos (c. 792 – 15 January 849), co-emperor from 812 to 813. He was castrated and exiled to a monastery. His date of death was recorded by Theophanes Continuatus.
 Staurakios (c. 793 – 813). Died prior to the abdication of his father. Circumstances unknown.
 Niketas (c. 797 – 23 October 877). He was castrated and exiled to a monastery. Later emerged as Patriarch Ignatios of Constantinople.
 Gorgo. Became a nun.
 Theophano. Became a nun.

Ignatios was later declared a saint. His hagiography records one of his sisters having helped iconodules during the persecutions of Theophilos (r. 829–842). However which one is unclear. 

A hagiography cite that Paul of Xeropotamou (born Procopius), who also became a saint of the Orthodox Church, was another son.

References

External links

|-

770s births
9th-century deaths
8th-century Byzantine women
9th-century Byzantine empresses
Nikephorian dynasty
Augustae
Daughters of Byzantine emperors
Byzantine people of Arab descent